Education Planet dba  Lesson Planet,  is a for-profit education company based in Santa Barbara, California. Lesson Planet provides teacher-reviewed resources for use by teachers and parents.  Its   products   are designed to supplement traditional and non-traditional education from kindergarten through the 12th grade. The firm was founded in 1999 by James Hurley, and is based in Santa Barbara, California.

 
The Lesson Planet division of the firm consists of an education-focused website and search engine, providing links to  teacher-reviewed resources that include lesson plans, worksheets, presentations, education-articles and  education videos. The reviews are prepared by the firm's staff of certified classroom teachers. The website is  searchable by grade and subject. 
 
The site  offers both paid and free digital content to educators. Current partners providing content include  Virtual Nerd  and other digital content providers.

Teacher Content Management System
Lesson Planet's architecture makes it easy for teachers to find teacher-reviewed, online classroom-oriented resources.
The Teacher Content Management System lets teachers find reviews for lesson plans, worksheets, educational videos, PowerPoint presentations and education articles.

Awards
Education Planet was named 2012 Codie award finalist for " Best Education Reference Solution" and won a 2007 Technology & Learning Award of Excellence for "Teacher Resources."
District Administration Magazine

References

Williams Honors Lesson Planet as 2012 Small Business of Year NoozHawk June 11, 2012

External links
Lesson Planet Company Home Page

Educational technology companies of the United States
Companies based in Santa Barbara, California
Education companies established in 1999
Privately held companies based in California
American educational websites
1999 establishments in California